Redivider may refer to:
 Redivider (film), a 2017 American-Dutch film
 ReDiviDeR, a jazz ensemble from Ireland